East Timorese Australians are Australian citizens of East Timorese descent or an East Timor-born person who resides in the Commonwealth of Australia.

East Timorese people in Australia are one of the largest groups of the East Timorese diaspora. They mainly speak Tetum, Portuguese and other local languages.

Migration history

Under Portuguese rule 
East Timorese immigration to Australia began with the arrival of the first migrants from the then Portuguese Timor in 1943 during World War II. This migration wave consisted of approximately 600 people who were evacuated from the island, of whom only 35 settled permanently after the war ended.

Indonesian occupation 
During the Indonesian invasion of 1975, a significant number of East Timorese fled to Darwin, situated 656 km (408 mi) from Dili. The Australian government accepted 2,500 East Timorese refugees in 1975, primarily those of Portuguese descent. Fretilin was reported to have been active in Darwin during this time using high frequencyHF radio communication to contact comrades in Dili. Darwin  proved an ideal base for Fretilin to operate its informal government in exile given the city's significant East Timorese exile community who supported independence.

See also 

 Immigration to Australia
 Asian Australians
 Australia–East Timor relations

References

External links
  (East Timorese in Sydney) [CC-By-SA]

Australia

Asian Australian